Magni is both a surname and a given name. Notable people with the name include:

Surname:
 Arturo Magni (1925–2015), Italian engineer and entrepreneur
 Caterina Magni (born 1966), Italian-born French archaeologist and anthropologist
 Cesare Magni (14951534), Italian painter
 Claude Magni (born 1950), French cyclist
 Eva Magni (1909–2005), Italian stage and film actress
 Fiorenzo Magni (19202012), Italian bicycle racer
 Gabriele Magni (born 1973), Italian fencer
 Giovanni Battista Magni (1592–1674), also known as Il Modenino, Italian painter, active in Rome
 Giovanni Pietro Magni (1655 - 1722/1724), German stuccoist born in Switzerland. 
 Luigi Magni (19282013), Italian screenwriter
 Nicholas Magni (13551435), Silesian theologian
 Oreste Magni (1936-1975), Italian racing cyclist
 Piero Magni (1898-1988), Italian aeronautical engineer
 Pietro Magni (disambiguation), various people
 Riccardo Magni (born 1976), Italian wrestler
 Secondo Magni (1912-1997), Italian racing cyclist

Given name:
 Magni Ásgeirsson (born 1978), Icelandic singer/musician and a contestant in the CBS show Rock Star: Supernova
 Magni Wentzel (born 1945), Norwegian jazz musician

Other uses:
Magni (comics), a Marvel Comics character
Móði and Magni, the sons of Thor and Jarnsaxa in Norse mythology

See also
 9670 Magni, an asteroid
 Magni Grenivík, an Icelandic football team
Magnicharters, an airline company based in Mexico City
 Magni Gyro, Italian manufacturer of autogyros:
 Magni M-14 Scout
 Magni M-16 Tandem Trainer
 Magni M-18 Spartan
 Magni M-24 Orion
 Magni Vale, an Italian civil monoplane
 Magni Vittoria,  Italian experimental, single seat, parasol wing aircraft
 Magnis (disambiguation)